The 1966 Monaco Grand Prix was a Formula One motor race held at the Circuit de Monaco on 22 May 1966. It was race 1 of 9 in both the 1966 World Championship of Drivers and the 1966 International Cup for Formula One Manufacturers. The race was the first World Championship event of a new era for Formula One, for which engine regulations were altered from 1.5 litres of maximum engine displacement to 3.0 litres. The race was the 24th Monaco Grand Prix.

The race was won by British driver Jackie Stewart driving a BRM P261. He took a forty-second victory over the Ferrari 246 of Italian driver Lorenzo Bandini. It was Stewart's second Grand Prix victory after winning the Italian Grand Prix the previous year. Stewart's team-mate, fellow Briton Graham Hill finished a lap down in third position in his BRM P261. The only other driver to be classified as a finisher was American driver Bob Bondurant driving a BRM P261 entered privately by Team Chamaco Collect.

Race report 
The first World Championship race of the new 3-litre engine formula was held in Monaco. Few teams were ready for the new regulations with several teams starting the race with 1965 engines still in place, or had adapted heavier sports car racing engines to suit.

Some sessions were filmed for the movie Grand Prix. It was the debut race of the McLaren racing team, and the Repco V8 in the back of Brabham's new 1966 BT19 chassis. The McLaren team debuted not in New Zealand's traditional racing colours of green, black and silver, but instead in white and green in order for Grand Prix director John Frankenheimer to be able to use the McLaren as a double for the fictional Yamura cars in the film. John Surtees, though still recovering from a crash at Mosport Park, led for 14 laps from Jackie Stewart, Jochen Rindt and Denny Hulme until his differential broke, handing the lead to Stewart. Hulme retired whilst Graham Hill and Jim Clark disputed third place before Clark's suspension gave out. Meanwhile, Lorenzo Bandini was smashing the lap record before having to ease off to prevent the front brakes wearing out. Stewart won from Bandini with Graham Hill third and Bob Bondurant fourth the only other car past the line in a race of extreme attrition. New rules meant that cars had to complete 90% of the race distance to be classified and eligible for points, meaning that whilst Guy Ligier and Jo Bonnier were still racing, they were considered far enough behind to have actually retired.  To this day, this race holds the record for having the fewest classified finishers in a single race in Formula One history.

Classification

Qualifying

Race

Championship standings after the race 

Drivers' Championship standings

Constructors' Championship standings

 Notes: Only the top five positions are included for both sets of standings.

References

Monaco Grand Prix
Monaco Grand Prix
Grand Prix